Santa Maria delle Grazie is a Baroque-style Roman Catholic church located on Via Garibaldi in the town of Loro Piceno, province of Macerata, in the region of Marche, Italy.

History
Thi church was built in 1666 under the patronage of the Confraternity of the Santissimo Sacramento, who maintained ownership until the 19th century. It underwent reconstructions in  1724 and 1777, and restorations in 1939, 1951 and during the 1980s. 

The brick façade has monumental pilasters holding a triangular tympanum with a central oculus. The interior has a single nave. The arch overlooking the presbytery has rich stucco decoration with an inscription: DABO GRA - TIAM POPULO. The lateral walls of the nave contain mirrors in the stucco with rich sculptural decoration and two paintings depicting the Translation of the Holy House of Loreto with the Madonna and Saints Liborio, Francis, Mark and Anne. The stucco ceiling decorations includes depictions of doves, symbolizing the Holy Spirit.

References

17th-century Roman Catholic church buildings in Italy
Baroque architecture in Marche
Loro Piceno
Loro Piceno
Loro Piceno